Baloch Got castle is a historical castle located in Chabahar County in Sistan and Baluchestan Province, The longevity of this fortress dates back to the 1st millennium BC.

References 

Castles in Iran
Chabahar County